Shala Darpan is an ICT Programme of Ministry of Human Resource Development, Government of India that to provide mobile access to parents of students of Government and Government aided schools. This information can only be obtained about the students of government schools. The implementation of Shala Darpan Portal is with the Rajasthan Government Education Department.

Facilities available on Rajasthan Shala Darpan portal 

 School search process
 Process to view school report
 Procedure for viewing student's report
 Procedure for viewing staff report
 Scheme Search Process
 Know Your School NICSD ID
 Process to know the staff details
 Staff login
 Transfer schedule

References 

Ministry of Education (India)
E-government in India
Educational software
E-learning in India